The Gateway Community Church is a non-denominational church located in Baguio, Philippines .

History 

Gateway Community Church was founded by Senior Pastor Rodolfo 'Sohl' De Guia on April 7, 2002. 

It started when Rodolfo started his seminary studies and he and his wife began to find a new engaging ministry. It began as a small group of people and has continued with steady growth.

In 2008, the Church gained an average attendance of 175 people and started to hold services at three different locations. Dr. Anthony Dela Fuente gave the church its name "The Little Big Church"  and lauded GCC as an Emerging Church.

In late 2009, the Church moved to a bigger space along Legarda Rd.

Plans 
In 2009, Gateway Community Church started to plan to move out from a space of 60 sq m to 400 sq m, from a monthly lease of PhP12,000 to PhP112,000. The dream was big. But beyond the monetary strain was a bigger challenge - how to fill a room larger by eight times the original space with people. The congregation was undaunted by the task and so the ‘crossing over’ began.  By the end of that year, GCC changed its address and its statistical records updated.

A year after the ‘diaspora,’ the challenge of numeral growth is now one for the historical books of GCC.  The number now averages from 220-270 every Sunday - an 82% increase in attendance from 2007.     The constant growth is attributed to intentional community engagement and dedicated discipleship. Weekly coaching of cell leaders and the Ladder of Success program are in place to train and prepare all members for discipleship. In three years, over 30 cell groups have been created and new ones are born each week.

References

External links 
 Gateway Community Church

Baguio
Churches in Benguet
2002 establishments in the Philippines